Dino Philipson (1889–1972) was an Italian lawyer and anti-Fascist politician who was a member of the Liberal Party. During the Fascist rule he left Italy, but then returned to the country and was arrested by the Fascist authorities.

Early life and education
Philipson was born in Florence in 1889. His father, Edoardo Philipson, was an engineer who was one of the most influential members of the Florentine Jewish Community of the nineteenth century. Philipson was the business partner of Ubaldino Peruzzi who served as the minister of public works for two terms. His mother was Sophie Rodrigues Pereire, daughter of Isaac Pereire, who was a French banker of Sephardi descent from Portugal. 

Dino Philipson was raised in Pistoia and obtained a bachelor's degree in law and social sciences in Florence. Following the start of World War I he was enlisted in the army and was later promoted to the rank of lieutenant.

Career and activities
In 1919 Philipson became the president of the Pistoia section of the National Combatants and Veterans Association. The same year he was elected as a deputy from Florence on the list called Liberal Concentration. In the 1921 elections he was also elected to the Parliament from the National Bloc. Later he joined the Liberal Democratic Union. When the Kingdom of Italy totally became under the Fascist rule from 1922 Philipson left the country for Paris, France. There he had connections with the liberal and moderate anti-Fascism movements. 

Philipson returned to Italy in the mid-1930s. He and Eugenio Coloroni were arrested by the OVRA (Italian secret police) in October 1938. Philipson detained in Isole Tremiti for three years and then, was transferred to Sala Consilina and Eboli in southern Campania. After the fall of the Fascist rule he was freed and was appointed undersecretary to Prime Minister Pietro Badoglio in February 1944, but his term was very brief and ended in April 1944. Next Philipson was appointed member of the National Council, the forerunner of the Italian Parliament. He retired from politics and devoted himself to his legal profession and freemasonry.

Philipson died in Pistoia in 1972.

References

External links

19th-century Italian Jews
20th-century Italian Jews
1889 births
1972 deaths
Italian Freemasons
Italian prisoners and detainees
Italian anti-fascists
Italian military personnel of World War I
20th-century Italian lawyers
Deputies of Legislature XXV of the Kingdom of Italy
Deputies of Legislature XXVI of the Kingdom of Italy
Italian Liberal Party politicians
Exiled Italian politicians
Politicians from Florence
Jewish Italian politicians